Peter Hooper may refer to:

 Peter Hooper (footballer) (1933–2011), English footballer
 Peter Hooper (writer) (1919–1991), New Zealand teacher, writer, bookseller and conservationist
 Peter R. Hooper (1931–2012), British geologist and author